Roman Yakub (born 1958) is a composer who received his early musical training in Lviv, Ukraine. He graduated from Lviv Conservatory in 1982 with a diploma in Music Composition. In 1991, he moved to the United States, where he earned a master's degree in music composition at the University of Massachusetts Amherst and a Doctor of Musical Arts Degree in composition at Boston University., In 2006, he won First Prize in the Ithaca College Choral Composition Competition  for "Wynken, Blynken, and Nod". In 1997, Yakub became a runner-up in the ALEA III International Composition Competition.

In 2003, Roman Yakub received a National Telly Award for the music to the TV commercial promoting a new concert venue for the Memphis Symphony Orchestra. He was also a recipient of the ASCAP annual Composer Award (2002-2010) and fellow of the MacDowell Colony (2000).

Yakub's music has been performed in the former Soviet Union (Moscow, Kiev, Yerevan, Baku, Lviv, etc.), as well as in the USA, Yugoslavia, Poland and Germany. His music has been commissioned by New York City festivals "Bridge" and "Bachanalia", University of Massachusetts, Lviv Philharmonic Orchestra, Ministry of Culture of Russia, and by numerous theater and TV companies. He has taught music in various music schools throughout Russia, Ukraine and the US. He was a faculty member at Boston University, Amherst College, Hampshire College, and Voronezh Academy of Arts among others. Yakub's music is published by Santa Barbara Music Publishing.

Discography
Tea Ceremonies Music (Emergency Exit, Moscow 2004)
Opium Ceremonies Music (Emergency Exit, Moscow 2004)

References

External links
 Official website

American male composers
21st-century American composers
Boston University College of Fine Arts alumni
University of Massachusetts Amherst alumni
1958 births
Living people
Lviv Conservatory alumni
Musicians from Lviv
21st-century American male musicians